Elise Paige Baughman is an American voice actress who works for anime series at Funimation and New Generation Pictures. She provided voices for a number of English versions of Japanese anime series.

Filmography

Anime
 Burst Angel - Angelique
 Case Closed - Yoko Okino
 Daphne in the Brilliant Blue - Mieko Muzuki
 Darker than Black: Gemini of the Meteor - Michiru
 Desert Punk - Mother (Ep 13)
 Dragon Ball GT - Pan
 Dragon Ball GT: A Hero's Legacy - Pan
 Dragon Ball Z Kai - Pan
 Fruits Basket - Momiji's Mother, Rika Aida (Ep. 22)
 Fruits Basket (2019 series) - Momiji's Mother
 Girls Bravo - Yukina
 GunXSword - Secretary
 Hell Girl - Chiaki "Chie" Tanuma (Ep. 7)
 Kamichu! - Yoko (Ep. 16)
 Kiddy Grade - Ricky
 Mermaid Forest - Oba-chan
 Negima! - Eiko
 Sakura Taisen: Ecole de Paris - Hanabi Kitaoji
 Spiral: The Bonds of Reasoning - Sayoko Shiranagatani
 Yu Yu Hakusho - Ayame

Video games
 Dragon Ball (series) - Pan
 Fullmetal Alchemist and the Broken Angel - Armony Elisestein

References

External links

 
 
 

Living people
Actresses from Dallas
Actresses from Louisiana
Actresses from Los Angeles
American film actresses
American television actresses
American television hosts
American television journalists
American video game actresses
American voice actresses
American women television journalists
Journalists from California
Journalists from Texas
Louisiana Tech University alumni
People from Monroe, Louisiana
People from Ruston, Louisiana
American women television presenters
Year of birth missing (living people)
21st-century American actresses